Martinhoe is a small settlement and civil parish in North Devon district of Devon, England. Martinhoe is within the Exmoor National Park, the smallest National Park in England. In the 2011 census Martinhoe Parish was recorded as having a population of 159. Martinhoe is in the Combe Martin ward, for elections to the district council.  Martinhoe's local government takes the form of a parish meeting and as such has no parish council nor elected parish councillors.

The northern boundary of the parish is the coast of the Bristol Channel, along which goes the South West Coast Path. The neighbouring parishes are Lynton and Lynmouth to the east, Parracombe to the south, Kentisbury to the south west, and Combe Martin to the west.

The parish church of St Martin dates in part from the late 13th or early 14th century and is Grade II*  listed. It is in the Diocese of Exeter, and services are held once a month. The boundaries of the church consist of Devon hedges.

The churchyard once had two mature Irish Yew Trees. One was lost in the storms of 2021. Two English Yew Trees were planted in 2022. 

There are 16 listed buildings in the parish, all at Grade II except the church. The Beacon Roman fortlet, above the coast to the north west of the village, was occupied for a short time in the first century AD and was excavated in the 1960s. The fort can only be accessed from the South West Coast Path and not from the Martinhoe settlement itself.

Hannington Hall, opposite the church of St Martin, was named after James Hannington, a curate of Martinhoe and who lived in what is now The Old Rectory Hotel, next to St Martin's. Bishop Hannington was martyred in Uganda in 1885.

Hilda Doolittle and her husband Richard Aldington moved into the Martinhoe School House in 1916 and she wrote many of her poems and essays there.

Woody Bay on the coast of the parish was the site of a failed development plan in the 1890s. It is now home to rare flora. Woody Bay is owned by the National Trust.

Heddon Valley is in the Martinhoe Parish. The valley is home to rare butterflies. The valley is owned by the National Trust.

The River Heddon flows through the Heddon Valley into the Bristol Channel at Heddon Mouth where there is an old lime kiln.

The Lynton and Barnstaple Railway ran through the southern part of the parish, and Woody Bay railway station is in the parish; at  it is said to be the highest railway station in southern England. The Lynton and Barnstaple Railway Trust operates narrow gauge trains over one mile of track between the station and Killington Lane. The service runs mainly in the warmer months but has a Santa Express at Christmas. It recently had planning permission to extend the line to the Blackmoor Gate.

References

Further reading
 Includes large-scale map, aerial and other photographs, and description.

External links

Villages in Devon
Civil parishes in Devon
North Devon